Mongo, also called Nkundo or Mongo-Nkundu (Lomongo, Lonkundu), is a Bantu language spoken by several of the Mongo peoples in the Democratic Republic of the Congo. Mongo speakers reside in central DR Congo over a large area inside the curve of the Congo River. Mongo is a tonal language.

There are many dialects. Maho (2009) lists one of these, Bafoto (Batswa de l'Equateur), C.611, as a separate language. The others are:

 Kutu (Bakutu), including Longombe
 Bokote, including Ngata
 Booli
 Bosaka
 Konda (Ekonda), including Bosanga-Ekonda
 Ekota
 Emoma
 Ikongo, including Lokalo-Lomela
 Iyembe
 Lionje, Nsongo, Ntomba
 Yamongo
 Mbole, including Nkengo, Yenge, Yongo, Bosanga-Mbole, Mangilongo, Lwankamba
 Nkole
 South Mongo, including Bolongo, Belo, Panga, Acitu
 Yailima
 Ngombe-Lomela, Longombe, Ngome à Múná

Phonology

Consonants 

 /d͡z/ can be heard as alveolar or dental [d̪͡z̪] and /t͡s/ can be alveolar or postalveolar [t͡ʃ], when before front vowels.

Vowels

References

External links
Mongo, Nkundo on PanAfril10n

 
Bangi-Ntomba languages
Languages of the Democratic Republic of the Congo